"In My Memory" is a song by Dutch producer DJ Tiësto. It was released in April 2002 as a single from his debut album, In My Memory. The song includes vocals by Nicola Hitchcock of the band Mandalay. The song did not chart in Europe, but being the title track for the album it gained great success in North America.

"In My Memory" was remixed by various artists like the San Francisco duo Gabriel & Dresden and Airwave. Other artists like V-One, Fade and Quadra also remixed it and were included in the various releases.

Formats and track listings

12" Vinyl
Magik Muzik 12" Vinyl
 "In My Memory" (V-One Remix) - 8:07
 "In My Memory" (Airwave Remix) - 8:45
 "In My Memory" (Gabriel & Dresden Elephant Memory Vocal) - 9:12
 "In My Memory" (Fade's Sanctuary Remix) - 8:48

Electropolis 12" Vinyl
 "In My Memory" (Gabriel & Dresden Elephant Memory Vocal) - 9:09
 "In My Memory" (V-One Remix) - 8:07
 "In My Memory" (Airwave Remix) - 8:45
 "In My Memory" (Airwave Instrumental) - 8:03

Zomba Records 12" Vinyl
 "In My Memory" (Airwave Remix) - 8:45
 "In My Memory" (Original Album Version) - 6:06
 "In My Memory" (Quadra's Bombworkxs Dub Mix) - 9:18
 "In My Memory" (Fade's Sanctuary Mix) - 8:48

Nebula Classics 12" Vinyl
 "In My Memory" (Fade's Drifted Remix) - 8:27
 "In My Memory" (Gabriel & Dresden Elephant Memory Vocal Remix) - 8:54

Nebula Classics 12" Vinyl
 "In My Memory" (Airwave Instrumental Remix) - 8:04
 "In My Memory" (V-One Remix) - 8:08
Radio Edit 3:59

Personnel
 Vocals: Nicola Hitchcock
 Writer(s), Composer(s): DJ Tiësto & Nicola Hitchcock

Charts

Weekly charts

Year-end charts

Official versions
 Original Album Version (6:06)
 Quadra's Bombworkxs Dub Mix (9:18)
 Fade's Sanctuary Mix (8:48)
 Fade's Drifted Remix (8:27)
 Gabriel & Dresden Elephant Memory Vocal Remix (9:09)
 V-One Remix (8:07)
 Airwave Remix (8:45)
 Airwave Instrumental (8:03)

Release history

References

Tiësto songs
2002 songs
Songs written by Tiësto